"Car Crash While Hitchhiking" is a work of short fiction by the American writer Denis Johnson based on a real incident in Johnson's life. 
The story was first published in The Paris Review in 1989 and collected in the 1990 edition of The Best American Short Stories. "Car Crash While Hitchhiking" is the opening story in Johnson's short story collection Jesus' Son (1992).

Plot
In this story, a drug-addicted narrator recounts hitchhiking in four different vehicles, first with a Cherokee, then a salesperson, then a college student, and finally a family composed of a husband, wife, young daughter and a baby. The salesperson is drunk and shares alcohol and pills with the narrator before leaving him off to find a student who drives him until he catches a ride with the family. Eventually, this vehicle is struck by another car resulting in the death of the driver of the other car. The story ends with the narrator looking back several years later, seemingly in detox, as he recounts his drug abuse, which the entire narration of the story reflects in a style of disconnect from reality.

Critical assessment
"Car Crash While Hitchhiking" opens Johnson's 1992 short fiction collection Jesus' Son. The story is perhaps "the volume's most arresting work" and, according to critic J. Robert Lennon, a story that exhibits "sudden swerves in diction, from the straightforward and unadorned to the wildly metaphorical and self-conscious." He adds:

Author David L Ulin considers "Car Crash" the "most vivid short story that I know."

Representative of the "multiple interlocking stories" that comprise the collection of short fiction in Jesus' Son, the title story deals almost exclusively with the "phantasmagorical" experiences of the drug-addicted. Critic Troy Jollimore calls "Car Crash While Hitchhiking" a classic of the American short story form."

Johnson studied writing at the Iowa Writers' Workshop in the 1970s under the mentorship of author Raymond Carver. Critic Sandy English observes that "Carver is clearly an influence on Johnson's work."
Johnson's mastery of the short story form is on display in "Car-Crash While Hitchhiking", a tale that takes the reader into the world of the protagonist's "drug-fueled insanity." Literary critic Jeffery Eugenides writes:

Footnotes

Sources 
 
 
 
 
 
 
 

1989 short stories
American short stories
Works by Denis Johnson
Works originally published in The Paris Review